Gnaphosa balearicola is a ground spider species found in the Balearic Islands.

See also 
 List of Gnaphosidae species

References

External links 

Gnaphosidae
Spiders of Europe
Fauna of the Balearic Islands
Spiders described in 1942